Krasimir Dunev (born 11 September 1972) is a Bulgarian gymnast. He competed at the 1992 Summer Olympics and the 1996 Summer Olympics. He won a silver medal at the 1996 Olympics, in the men's horizontal bar.

References

External links
 

1972 births
Living people
Bulgarian male artistic gymnasts
Olympic gymnasts of Bulgaria
Gymnasts at the 1992 Summer Olympics
Gymnasts at the 1996 Summer Olympics
Medalists at the 1996 Summer Olympics
Olympic medalists in gymnastics
Olympic silver medalists for Bulgaria
Medalists at the World Artistic Gymnastics Championships
Sportspeople from Plovdiv
European champions in gymnastics
20th-century Bulgarian people